Pseudepigrapha (also anglicized as "pseudepigraph" or "pseudepigraphs") are falsely attributed works, texts whose claimed author is not the true author, or a work whose real author attributed it to a figure of the past, called generically a pseudo-author and specifically Pseudo-Name, prefixing the author's name with the particle "pseudo-".

In biblical studies, the term pseudepigrapha can refer to an assorted collection of Jewish religious works thought to be written  300 BCE to 300 CE. They are distinguished by Protestants from the deuterocanonical books (Catholic and Orthodox) or Apocrypha (Protestant), the books that appear in extant copies of the Septuagint in the fourth century or later and the Vulgate, but not in the Hebrew Bible or in Protestant Bibles. The Catholic Church distinguishes only between the deuterocanonical and all other books; the latter are called biblical apocrypha, which in Catholic usage includes the pseudepigrapha. In addition, two books considered canonical in the Orthodox Tewahedo churches, the Book of Enoch and Book of Jubilees, are categorized as pseudepigrapha from the point of view of Chalcedonian Christianity.

In addition to the sets of generally agreed to be non-canonical works, scholars will also apply the term to canonical works who make a direct claim of authorship, yet this authorship is doubted.  For example, the Book of Daniel is considered by some to have been written in the 2nd century BCE, 400 years after the prophet Daniel lived, and thus for them, the work is pseudepigraphic.  A New Testament example might be the book of 2 Peter, considered by some to be written approximately 80 years after Saint Peter's death. Early Christians, such as Origen, harbored doubts as to the authenticity of the book's authorship.

The term has also been used by  Muslims to describe hadiths, which are not universally accepted by Muslims; many claim that most hadiths are fabrications, created in the 8th and 9th century AD, and which are falsely attributed to the Islamic prophet Muhammad.

Etymology

Classical and biblical studies
There have probably been pseudepigrapha almost from the invention of full writing. For example, ancient Greek authors often refer to texts which claimed to be by Orpheus or his pupil Musaeus of Athens but which attributions were generally disregarded. Already in Antiquity the collection known as the "Homeric Hymns" was recognized as pseudepigraphical, that is, not actually written by Homer. The only surviving Ancient Roman book on cooking is pseudepigraphically attributed to a famous gourmet, Apicius, even though it is not clear who actually assembled the recipes.

Literary studies
In secular literary studies, when works of antiquity have been demonstrated not to have been written by the authors to whom they have traditionally been ascribed, some writers apply the prefix pseudo- to their names. Thus the encyclopedic compilation of Greek myth called the Bibliotheca is often now attributed, not to Apollodorus of Athens, but to "pseudo-Apollodorus" and the Catasterismi, recounting the translations of mythic figure into asterisms and constellations, not to the serious astronomer Eratosthenes, but to a "pseudo-Eratosthenes". The prefix may be abbreviated, as in "ps-Apollodorus" or "ps-Eratosthenes".

Old Testament and intertestamental studies

In biblical studies, pseudepigrapha refers particularly to works which purport to be written by noted authorities in either the Old and New Testaments or by persons involved in Jewish or Christian religious study or history. These works can also be written about biblical matters, often in such a way that they appear to be as authoritative as works which have been included in the many versions of the Judeo-Christian scriptures. Eusebius indicates this usage dates back at least to Serapion of Antioch, whom Eusebius records as having said: "But those writings which are falsely inscribed with their name (ta pseudepigrapha), we as experienced persons reject...."

Many such works were also referred to as Apocrypha, which originally connoted "secret writings", those that were rejected for liturgical public reading. An example of a text that is both apocryphal and pseudepigraphical is the Odes of Solomon. It is considered pseudepigraphical because it was not actually written by Solomon but instead is a collection of early Christian (first to second century) hymns and poems, originally written not in Hebrew, and apocryphal because they were not accepted in either the Tanakh or the New Testament.

Protestants have also applied the word Apocrypha to texts found in Catholic and Eastern Orthodox scriptures which were not found in Hebrew manuscripts. Catholics call those "deuterocanonical books". Accordingly, there arose in some Protestant biblical scholarship an extended use of the term pseudepigrapha for works that appeared as though they ought to be part of the biblical canon, because of the authorship ascribed to them, but which stood outside both the biblical canons recognized by Protestants and Catholics. These works were also outside the particular set of books that Roman Catholics called deuterocanonical and to which Protestants had generally applied the term Apocryphal. Accordingly, the term pseudepigraphical, as now used often among both Protestants and Roman Catholics (allegedly for the clarity it brings to the discussion), may make it difficult to discuss questions of pseudepigraphical authorship of canonical books dispassionately with a lay audience. To confuse the matter even more, Eastern Orthodox Christians accept books as canonical that Roman Catholics and most Protestant denominations consider pseudepigraphical or at best of much less authority. There exist also churches that reject some of the books that Roman Catholics, Orthodox and Protestants accept. The same is true of some Jewish religious movements. Many works that are "apocryphal" are otherwise considered genuine.

There is a tendency not to use the word pseudepigrapha when describing works later than about 300 CE when referring to biblical matters. But the late-appearing Gospel of Barnabas, Apocalypse of Pseudo-Methodius, the Pseudo-Apuleius (author of a fifth-century herbal ascribed to Apuleius), and the author traditionally referred to as the "Pseudo-Dionysius the Areopagite", are classic examples of pseudepigraphy. In the fifth century the moralist Salvian published Contra avaritiam ("Against avarice") under the name of Timothy; the letter in which he explained to his former pupil, Bishop Salonius, his motives for so doing survives. There is also a category of modern pseudepigrapha.

Examples of books labeled Old Testament pseudepigrapha from the Protestant point of view are the Book of Enoch, the Book of Jubilees (both of which are canonical in Orthodox Tewahedo Christianity and the Beta Israel branch of Judaism); the Life of Adam and Eve and "Pseudo-Philo".

The term pseudepigrapha is also commonly used to describe numerous works of Jewish religious literature written from about 300 BCE to 300 CE. Not all of these works are actually pseudepigraphical. It also refers to books of the New Testament canon whose authorship is misrepresented. Such works include the following:
 3 Maccabees
 4 Maccabees
 Assumption of Moses
 Ethiopic Book of Enoch (1 Enoch)
 Slavonic Second Book of Enoch
 Book of Jubilees
 3 Baruch
 Letter of Aristeas
 Life of Adam and Eve
 Ascension of Isaiah
 Psalms of Solomon
 Sibylline Oracles
 2 Baruch
 Testaments of the Twelve Patriarchs
 4 Ezra

Various canonical works accepted as scripture have since been reexamined and considered by modern scholars in the 19th century onward as likely cases of pseudepigraphica.  The Book of Daniel directly claims to be written by the prophet Daniel, yet there are strong reasons to believe it was not written until centuries after Daniel's death, such as references to the book only appearing in the 2nd century BCE and onward.  The book is an apocalypse wherein Daniel offers a series of predictions of the future, and is meant to reassure the Jews of the period that the tyrant Antiochus IV Epiphanes would soon be overthrown. By backdating the book to the 6th century BCE and providing a series of correct prophecies as to the history of the past 400 years, the authorship claim of Daniel would have strengthened a later author's predictions of the coming fall of the Seleucid Empire.

New Testament studies
Some Christian scholars maintain that nothing known to be pseudepigraphical was admitted to the New Testament canon. However, many biblical scholars, such as Bart D. Ehrman, hold that only seven of Paul's epistles are convincingly genuine. All of the other 20 books in the New Testament appear to many scholars to be written by unknown people who were not the well-known biblical figures to whom the early Christian leaders originally attributed authorship. The Catholic Encyclopedia notes,
The first four historical books of the New Testament are supplied with titles, which however ancient, do not go back to the respective authors of those sacred texts. The Canon of Muratori, Clement of Alexandria, and St. Irenaeus bear distinct witness to the existence of those headings in the latter part of the second century of our era. Indeed, the manner in which Clement (Strom. I, xxi), and St. Irenaeus (Adv. Haer. III, xi, 7) employ them implies that, at that early date, our present titles to the gospels had been in current use for some considerable time. Hence, it may be inferred that they were prefixed to the evangelical narratives as early as the first part of that same century. That however, they do not go back to the first century of the Christian era, or at least that they are not original, is a position generally held at the present day. It is felt that since they are similar for the four Gospels, although the same Gospels were composed at some interval from each other, those titles were not framed and consequently not prefixed to each individual narrative, before the collection of the four Gospels was actually made. Besides as well pointed out by Prof. Bacon, "the historical books of the New Testament differ from its apocalyptic and epistolary literature, as those of the Old Testament differ from its prophecy, in being invariably anonymous, and for the same reason. Prophecies, whether in the earlier or in the later sense, and letters, to have authority, must be referable to some individual; the greater his name, the better. But history was regarded as common possession. Its facts spoke for themselves. Only as the springs of common recollection began to dwindle, and marked differences to appear between the well-informed and accurate Gospels and the untrustworthy ... become worth while for the Christian teacher or apologist to specify whether the given representation of the current tradition was 'according to' this or that special compiler, and to state his qualifications". It thus appears that the present titles of the Gospels are not traceable to the Evangelists themselves.The earliest and best manuscripts of Matthew, Mark, Luke and John were all written anonymously. Furthermore, the books of Acts, Hebrews, 1 John, 2 John and 3 John were also written anonymously.

Pauline epistles

There are thirteen letters in the New Testament which are attributed to Paul and are still considered by Christians to carry Paul's authority. These letters are part of the Christian Bible and are foundational for the Christian Church. Therefore, those letters which some think to be pseudepigraphic are not considered any less valuable to Christians. Some of these epistles are termed as "disputed" or "pseudepigraphical" letters because they do not appear to have been written by Paul. They instead appear to have come from followers writing in Paul's name, often using material from his surviving letters. Some choose to believe that these followers may have had access to letters written by Paul that no longer survive, although this theory still depends on someone other than Paul writing these books. Some theologians prefer to simply distinguish between "undisputed" and "disputed" letters, thus avoiding the term "pseudepigraphical".

Authorship of 6 out of the 13 canonical epistles of Paul has been questioned by both Christian and non-Christian biblical scholars. These include the Epistle to the Ephesians, Epistle to the Colossians, Second Epistle to the Thessalonians, First Epistle to Timothy, Second Epistle to Timothy, and Epistle to Titus. These six books are referred to as "deutero-Pauline letters", meaning "secondary" standing in the corpus of Paul's writings. They internally claim to have been written by Paul, but some biblical scholars present strong evidence that they could not have been written by Paul. Those known as the "Pastoral Epistles" (Timothy, 2 Timothy, and Titus) are all so similar that they are thought to be written by the same unknown author in Paul's name.

Catholic epistles 

There are seven letters in the New Testament which are attributed to several apostles, such as Saint Peter, John the Apostle, and Jesus's brothers James and Jude.

Three of the seven letters are anonymous. These three have traditionally been attributed to John the Apostle, the son of Zebedee and one of the Twelve Apostles of Jesus. Consequently, these letters have been labelled the Johannine epistles, despite the fact that none of the epistles mentions any author.  Most modern scholars believe the author is not John the Apostle, but there is no scholarly consensus for any particular historical figure. (see: Authorship of the Johannine works).

Two of the letters claim to have been written by Simon Peter, one of the Twelve Apostles of Jesus. Therefore, they have traditionally been called the Petrine epistles. However, most modern scholars agree the second epistle was probably not written by Peter, because it appears to have been written in the early 2nd century, long after Peter had died. Yet, opinions on the first epistle are more divided; many scholars do think this letter is authentic. (see: Authorship of the Petrine epistles)

In one epistle, the author only calls himself James (Ἰάκωβος Iákobos). It is not known which James this is supposed to be. There are several different traditional Christian interpretations of other New Testament texts which mention a James, brother of Jesus. However, most modern scholars tend to reject this line of reasoning, since the author himself does not indicate any familial relationship with Jesus. A similar problem presents itself with the Epistle of Jude (Ἰούδας Ioudas): the writer names himself a brother of James (ἀδελφὸς δὲ Ἰακώβου adelphos de Iakóbou), but it is not clear which James is meant. According to some Christian traditions, this is the same James as the author of the Epistle of James, who was allegedly a brother of Jesus; and so, this Jude should also be a brother of Jesus, despite the fact he does not indicate any such thing in his text.

Other pseudepigrapha
The Gospel of Peter and the attribution to Paul of the Epistle to the Laodiceans are both examples of pseudepigrapha that were not included in the New Testament canon. They are often referred to as New Testament apocrypha. Further examples of New Testament pseudepigrapha include the Gospel of Barnabas and the Gospel of Judas, which begins by presenting itself as "the secret account of the revelation that Jesus spoke in conversation with Judas Iscariot".

The Vision of Ezra is an ancient apocryphal text purportedly written by the biblical scribe Ezra. The earliest surviving manuscripts, composed in Latin, date to the 11th century AD, although textual peculiarities strongly suggest that the text was originally written in Greek. Like the Greek Apocalypse of Ezra, the work is clearly Christian, and features several apostles being seen in heaven. However, the text is significantly shorter than the Apocalypse.

The Donation of Constantine is a forged Roman imperial decree by which the 4th-century emperor Constantine the Great supposedly transferred authority over Rome and the western part of the Roman Empire to the Pope. Composed probably in the 8th century, it was used, especially in the 13th century, in support of claims of political authority by the papacy. Lorenzo Valla, an Italian Catholic priest and Renaissance humanist, is credited with first exposing the forgery with solid philological arguments in 1439–1440, although the document's authenticity had been repeatedly contested since 1001.

The Privilegium maius ('greater privilege') was a document composed in 1358 or 1359 - but purporting to be much older. Its text elevated the Duchy of Austria into an Archduchy of Austria, thus greatly increasing the prestige of Rudolf IV of Austria (1358–65) of the House of Habsburg.

In Russian history, in 1561 Muscovites supposedly received a letter from the Patriarch of Constantinople which asserted the right of Ivan the Terrible to claim the title of Tsar. This, too, turned out to be false. While earlier Russian Monarchs had on some occasions used the title "Tsar", Ivan the Terrible previously known as "Grand Prince of all the Russias" was the first to be formally crowned as Tsar of All Rus. This was related to Russia's growing ambitions to become an Orthodox "Third Rome", after the Fall of Constantinople - for which the supposed approval by the Patriarch added weight.

The Anaphorae of Mar Nestorius, employed in the Eastern Churches, is attributed to Nestorius but its earliest manuscripts are in Syriac which question it's Greek-authorship.

Authorship and pseudepigraphy: levels of authenticity
Scholars have identified seven levels of authenticity which they have organized in a hierarchy ranging from literal authorship, meaning written in the author's own hand, to outright forgery:
 Literal authorship. A church leader writes a letter in his own hand.
 Dictation. A church leader dictates a letter almost word for word to an amanuensis.
  Delegated authorship. A church leader describes the basic content of an intended letter to a disciple or to an amanuensis.
 Posthumous authorship. A church leader dies, and his disciples finish a letter that he had intended to write, sending it posthumously in his name.
 Apprentice authorship. A church leader dies, and disciples who had been authorized to speak for him while he was alive continue to do so by writing letters in his name years or decades after his death.
 Honorable pseudepigraphy. A church leader dies, and admirers seek to honor him by writing letters in his name as a tribute to his influence and in a sincere belief that they are responsible bearers of his tradition.
 Forgery. A church leader obtains sufficient prominence that, either before or after his death, people seek to exploit his legacy by forging letters in his name, presenting him as a supporter of their own ideas.

The Zohar

The Zohar (lit. Splendor or Radiance), foundational work in the literature of Jewish mystical thought known as Kabbalah, first appeared in Spain in the 13th century, and was published by a Jewish writer named Moses de León. De León ascribed the work to Shimon bar Yochai ("Rashbi"), a rabbi of the 2nd century during the Roman persecution who, according to Jewish legend, hid in a cave for thirteen years studying the Torah and was inspired by the Prophet Elijah to write the Zohar. This accords with the traditional claim by adherents that Kabbalah is the concealed part of the Oral Torah. Modern academic analysis of the Zohar, such as that by the 20th century religious historian Gershom Scholem, has theorized that de León was the actual author, as textual analysis points to a Medieval Spanish Jewish writer rather than one living in Roman-ruled Palestine.

Ovid

Conrad Celtes, a noted German humanist scholar and poet of the German Renaissance, collected numerous Greek and Latin manuscripts in his function as librarian of the Imperial Library in Vienna. In a 1504 letter to the Venetian publisher Aldus Manutius Celtes claimed to have discovered the missing books of Ovid’s Fasti. However, it turned out that the purported Ovid verses had actually been composed by an 11th-century monk and were known to the Empire of Nicaea according to William of Rubruck. Even so, many contemporary scholars believed Celtes and continued to write about the existence of the missing books until well into the 17th century.

As literary device 
Pseudepigraphy has been employed as a metafictional technique. Authors who have made notable use of this device include James Hogg (The Private Memoirs and Confessions of a Justified Sinner), Thomas Carlyle (Sartor Resartus), Jorge Luis Borges ("An Examination of the Works of Herbert Quain"; "Pierre Menard, Author of the Quixote"), Vladimir Nabokov (Pale Fire), Stanislaw Lem (A Perfect Vacuum; Imaginary Magnitude) Roberto Bolaño (Nazi Literature in the Americas) and Stefan Heym (The Lenz Papers).

Edgar Rice Burroughs also presented many of his works – including the most well-known, the Tarzan books – as pseudepigrapha, prefacing each book with a detailed introduction presenting the supposed actual author, with Burroughs himself pretending to be no more than the literary editor. J.R.R. Tolkien in The Lord of the Rings presents that story and The Hobbit as translated from the fictional Red Book of Westmarch written by characters within the novels. The twelve books of The Flashman Papers series by George MacDonald Fraser similarly pretend to be transcriptions of the papers left by an "illustrious Victorian soldier", each volume prefaced by a long semi-scholarly Explanatory Note stating that "additional packets of Flashman's papers have been found and are here presented to the public".  A similar device was used by various other writers of popular fiction.

See also 
 False attribution
 False document
 Literary forgery
 Journal for the Study of the Pseudepigrapha
 List of Old Testament pseudepigrapha
 Prophecy of the Popes

Citations

Sources 
 Cueva, Edmund P., and Javier Martínez, eds. Splendide Mendax: Rethinking Fakes and Forgeries in Classical, Late Antique, and Early Christian Literature. Groningen: Barkhuis, 2016.
 DiTommaso, Lorenzo. A Bibliography of Pseudepigrapha Research 1850–1999, Sheffield: Sheffield Academic Press, 2001.
 Ehrman, Bart. Forgery and Counterforgery: The Use of Literary Deceit in Early Christian Polemics. Oxford: Oxford University Press, 2013.
 Kiley, Mark. Colossians as Pseudepigraphy (Bible Seminar, 4 Sheffield: JSOT Press 1986). Colossians as a non-deceptive school product.
 Metzger, Bruce M. "Literary forgeries and canonical pseudepigrapha", Journal of Biblical Literature 91 (1972).
 von Fritz, Kurt, (ed.) Pseudepigraphica. 1 (Geneva: Foundation Hardt, 1972). Contributions on pseudopythagorica (the literature ascribed to Pythagoras), the Platonic Epistles, Jewish-Hellenistic literature, and the characteristics particular to religious forgeries.

External links 

 Online Critical Pseudepigrapha Online texts of the Pseudepigrapha in their original or extant ancient languages
 Smith, Mahlon H. Pseudepigrapha entry in Into His Own: Perspective on the World of Jesus online historical source book, at VirtualReligion.net
 Journal for the Study of the Pseudepigrapha official website

 
Apocrypha